The canton of Pons is an administrative division of the Charente-Maritime department, western France. Its borders were modified at the French canton reorganisation which came into effect in March 2015. Its seat is in Pons.

It consists of the following communes:

Avy
Belluire
Biron
Bois
Boisredon
Bougneau
Chadenac
Champagnolles
Courpignac
Échebrune
Fléac-sur-Seugne
Givrezac
Lorignac
Marignac
Mazerolles
Mirambeau
Mosnac
Plassac
Pons
Saint-Bonnet-sur-Gironde
Saint-Ciers-du-Taillon
Saint-Dizant-du-Gua
Sainte-Ramée
Saint-Fort-sur-Gironde
Saint-Genis-de-Saintonge
Saint-Georges-des-Agoûts
Saint-Germain-du-Seudre
Saint-Grégoire-d'Ardennes
Saint-Léger
Saint-Martial-de-Mirambeau
Saint-Palais-de-Phiolin
Saint-Quantin-de-Rançanne
Saint-Seurin-de-Palenne
Saint-Sorlin-de-Conac
Saint-Thomas-de-Conac
Salignac-de-Mirambeau
Semillac
Semoussac
Soubran

References

Cantons of Charente-Maritime